Bo Johansson (born 7 February 1945) is a retired Swedish middle-heavyweight weightlifter. Between 1968 and 1971 he won six medals at the world and European championships  and set five world records: four in the press and one on the clean and jerk.

Bo Johansson grew up as a bodybuilding fan. At the age of 16 he also took up weightlifting, and in 1966 became the Swedish Junior Champion in the light-heavyweight division. In 1968 he won the national senior heavyweight title with a total of 490 kg. He also placed fourth in the 1968 Summer Olympics and trained for the 1972 Summer Olympics, but was left out of the Olympic team after a conflict with the Swedish sports officials. In the early 1970s he won several Nordic bodybuilding competitions, becoming Mr. Sweden and Mr. Scandinavia, but his career as a weightlifter declined.

References

1945 births
Living people
Swedish male weightlifters
Swedish bodybuilders
Olympic weightlifters of Sweden
Weightlifters at the 1968 Summer Olympics
European Weightlifting Championships medalists
World Weightlifting Championships medalists
Sportspeople from Gothenburg